Cameron Parish School Board (CPSB) or Cameron Parish School District or Cameron Parish School System (CPSS) is a school district headquartered in unincorporated Cameron Parish, Louisiana, United States. The district serves Cameron Parish.

The district has its temporary headquarters at 1027 Highway 384 in the Grand Lake area.

History
In September 2005 Hurricane Rita struck Cameron Parish. Four of the parish's six public schools were destroyed or damaged; students from three other schools (Cameron Elementary, South Cameron Elementary, and South Cameron High) occupied Grand Lake High School while students from Johnson Bayou occupied Hackberry High School's campus.

School uniforms
Students are required to wear school uniforms.

Schools
Grand Lake High School (PK-12)
Hackberry High School (K-12)
Johnson Bayou High School (K-12)
As a result of the September 2008 Hurricane Ike, 80% of the Johnson Bayou campus received damage. The district was to try to get the Federal Emergency Management Agency (FEMA) to fund a replacement school instead of a repaired campus.
South Cameron High School (K-12)
 Was formerly two separate schools (South Cameron Elementary School and South Cameron High School)
 Hurricane Ike destroyed South Cameron's temporary buildings.
 Due to declining enrollment, South Cameron no longer sponsors football.

Former schools
 Cameron Elementary School (PreK-7)
 Closed after Hurricane Rita in fall 2005; school consolidated into South Cameron High School by fall 2006.
 Grand Chenier Elementary School
 Closed in 2001 after enrollment decreased to 60 students.
 South Cameron Elementary School
 Closed after Hurricane Rita in fall 2005; school consolidated into South Cameron High School by fall 2006.

References

External links

 Cameron Parish School Board

School districts in Louisiana
Education in Cameron Parish, Louisiana